The 1909 Olivet football team represented Olivet College during the 1909 college football season.

Schedule

References

Olivet
Olivet Comets football seasons
Olivet football